The title of  was a Byzantine court title created by Alexios I Komnenos using the imperial root  (the Greek translation of ). It was always conferred to members of aristocratic families closely allied to the imperial family. 

Alternatively, a domed  hat could be worn, again in red and gold, with a portrait of the emperor, standing crowned and flanked by angels, within a circle of pearls, in front. The  itself was also bordered with pearls.

References

Sources

 
 
 

 

Byzantine court titles
Court titles in the Middle Ages